Ayanna Webster-Roy is a Trinidad and Tobago People's National Movement politician. She has served as a Member of Parliament in the House of Representatives for Tobago East since the 2015 general election. She is also currently a Minister in the Office of the Prime Minister.

Early life 
Webster-Roy was born in Roxborough, Tobago and attended Roxborough Anglican School and Bishop's High School. She graduated from the University of the West Indies in 2002 with a major in Sociology and minors in Human Resource Management and Psychology. Her first job was with the National On-the-Job Training Programme as a Field / Placement Officer for the Tobago region. She moved with her husband to England, where she worked from 2004 to 2008 as a Project Officer for the North Central London Specialised Commissioning Team in the Haringey Teaching Primary Care Trust, St Ann's Hospital, London.

In April 2010, she became a Community Development Coordinator in the Department of Community Development in the Tobago House of Assembly.

Political career 
Webster-Roy was first elected to the Trinidad and Tobago House of Representatives on September 7, 2015, after the 2015 general election. She is a member of the People's National Movement for the electoral district of Tobago East. On September 11, 2015, she was appointed Minister of State in the Office of the Prime Minister. She was re-elected to her seat in the 2020 general election on August 10, 2020. On August 19, 2020, she was appointed Minister in the Office of the Prime Minister and she has responsibility for Gender and Child Affairs, Ecclesiastical Affairs and Central Administration Services in Tobago. In this role, she has been working on creating a white paper on the National Child Policy, which would be the first in the region.

Personal life 
She is married and has three children: two daughters and a son. She is currently studying for a master's degree in institutional innovation and effectiveness, focusing on the public sector.

References 

Living people
Year of birth missing (living people)
University of the West Indies alumni
People's National Movement politicians
Members of the House of Representatives (Trinidad and Tobago)
Women government ministers of Trinidad and Tobago
Government ministers of Trinidad and Tobago
21st-century Trinidad and Tobago women politicians
21st-century Trinidad and Tobago politicians